The United States Air Force's 1st Air Support Operations Squadron was a combat support unit located at Wiesbaden, Germany.

Mission 
The squadron provided tactical command and control of airpower assets to the Joint Forces Air Component Commander and Joint Forces Land Component Commander for combat operations.

History 
In March 2011, when the 1st Armored Division was relocated back to the United States, the squadron was inactivated and the remaining mission was taken over by the 4th Air Support Operations Group.

Lineage
 Constituted as the 1st Air Support Operations Squadron on 1 September 1996
 Activated on 30 September 1996
 Inactivated on 1 October 2011

Assignments
 4th Air Support Operations Group, 1 September 1996 – 1 October 2011

Stations
 Bad Kreuznach, Germany, 30 September 1996
 Wiesbaden, Germany, 31 July 2001 – 1 October 2011

Awards and campaigns

References

Notes

Bibliography

External links 
 Globalsecurity.org: 1st Air Support Operations Squadron

Air Support Operations 0001